Beinn Fhionnlaidh is the name of two mountains in Scotland, both listed as Munros:
Beinn Fhionnlaidh (Creran), 959 m, between Glen Creran and Glen Etive, in Argyll
Beinn Fhionnlaidh (Mullardoch), 1005 m, on the south side of Loch Mullardoch, between Glen Cannich and Glen Affric